Clark State College is a public community college in Springfield, Ohio. It opened in 1962 as Springfield and Clark County Technical Education Program. As of 2018, the school was approved for bachelor's degrees in web design and manufacturing technology, in addition to 125 day, evening, weekend and online certificate and associate degree programs. It also includes one of the many police academies in the state.

References

External links
 Official website

 
Education in Clark County, Ohio
Buildings and structures in Springfield, Ohio
USCAA member institutions
Community colleges in Ohio
NJCAA athletics
Educational institutions established in 1962
1962 establishments in Ohio